John McDowall may refer to:
 John McDowall (swimmer), British swimmer
 John Kevan McDowall, Scottish solicitor and politician

See also
 John McDowell (disambiguation)